The Men's team time trial of the 2016 UCI Road World Championships was a cycling event that took place on 9 October 2016 in Doha, Qatar. It was the 32nd edition of the championship, and the 5th since its reintroduction for trade teams in 2012. American team  were the defending champions, having won in 2014 and 2015.

Course

UCI WorldTour teams boycott of team time trial
In August 2016 the AIGCP approved a motion for all UCI WorldTeams to boycott the time trial event, due to the UCI insisting that WorldTeams should compete in the event as a requirement of granting a WorldTeam licence without providing a participation allowance to teams, as is the case with other UCI World Tour races. It was reported that the UCI Professional Continental teams attending the AIGCP General Assembly also supported the motion.

On 13 September, the UCI released a statement, saying that the UCI and the AIGCP had agreed on a number of adjustments to the format, ensuring the participation of at least a number of UCI WorldTeams. Both organisations have agreed on a non-compulsory format, with no UCI WorldTour points to be awarded. Following this agreement, a number of UCI WorldTeams have announced their participation.

Final classification

References

Men's team time trial
UCI Road World Championships – Men's team time trial
2016 in men's road cycling